Khvajeh Aur (also Romanized as Khvājeh ʿAūr; also known as Khvājeh Ghūr) is a village in Qaranqu Rural District, in the Central District of Hashtrud County, East Azerbaijan Province, Iran. At the 2006 census, its population was 307, in 59 families.

References 

Towns and villages in Hashtrud County